Leptocyrtinus is a genus of longhorn beetles of the subfamily Lamiinae, containing the following species:

 Leptocyrtinus albosetosus Breuning, 1943
 Leptocyrtinus hebridarum Breuning, 1943
 Leptocyrtinus nitidus (Aurivillius, 1926)
 Leptocyrtinus similis Breuning, 1948
 Leptocyrtinus uniformis Breuning, 1943

References

Cyrtinini